Steel Town is a Czech drama film directed by Martin Frič. It was released in 1950.

Cast
 Oldřich Lukeš as Franta
 Josef Chvalina as Starek
 Jana Dítětová as Marie
 Jaroslav Mareš as Jan
 František Kovárík as Kolarik
 Marta Fricová as Secretary
 Jindra Hermanová as German Woman
 František Klika as Trade Unionist
 Stanislav Langer as Jauris
 Marie Nademlejnská
 Zdenek Savrda

References

External links
 

1950 films
1950s Czech-language films
1950 drama films
Czechoslovak black-and-white films
Films directed by Martin Frič
Czech drama films
1950s Czech films